David Carlisle Hull (November 20, 1869 – April 3, 1928) was the President of the Mississippi Agricultural and Mechanical College (now Mississippi State University) from 1920 to 1925, and president of Kentucky Wesleyan College from 1925 until his death in 1928.

Personal life
Hull was the father of Roger Hull, president of the Mutual Life Insurance Company of New York.

Legacy
Hull Hall at Mississippi State is named in his honor.

References

External links
Mississippi State University General Information
Gallery of the Presidents

Presidents of Mississippi State University
1869 births
1928 deaths